Aliabad-e Vasat (also Romanized as ‘Alīābād-e Vasaţ; also known as ‘Alīābād-e Mīāneh) is a village in Azghand Rural District, Shadmehr District, Mahvelat County, Razavi Khorasan Province, Iran. At the 2006 census, its population was 232, in 50 families.

See also 

 List of cities, towns and villages in Razavi Khorasan Province

References 

Populated places in Mahvelat County